University and University College Act 1971 or AUKU 1971 is an act of Parliament that was legislated by the Malaysian government that was approved by the king on 27 April 1971. It is also an act that is partially under the legislative authority of the Ministry of Higher Education (Malaysia) to "provide for the establishment, organization and management of Universities and Public University Colleges and for matters connected herewith." This act was amended in 1975 and 1995 and became the University and University College Act (Amended) 1995.

Structure
The Universities and University Colleges Act 1971, in its current form (1 August 2012), consists of 5 Parts containing 27 sections and 2 schedules (including 6 amendments).
 Part I: Preliminary
 Part II: Higher Education
 Part IIA: Administration
 Part III: Universities
 Part IV: University Colleges
 Part IVA: Register and Database
 Part V: General
 Schedules

Controversy and Student repression 
According to Abdullah Haji Abdul Karim, Director of the Central PAS Youth Department for Student Affairs, in a statement he made on the Harakah Daily website, although it was obvious that AUKU 1971 bill was passed to provide for the establishment, maintenance and administration of University and University Colleges and for other matters connected therewith, in the new sections that were entered into it after the 1975 amendment (argued for by then-Education Minister Tun Dr. Mahathir bin Mohamad) through the A295 Amendment Act, among which are Sections 15A, 15B, 15C, 15D, 16A, 16B and 16C, clearly opposed the principles of justice within the law. The main goals of the 1975 amendment blocks:
 the involvement of students in political parties and labour unions, and
 the union of student bodies
However, the 2012 and 2018 amendment abolished Section 15A, thus providing students' involvement in politics. Despite these amendments, several student activists demanded that the law to be abolished to re-establish democracy in campus.

References

External links
  

1971 in Malaysian law
Malaysian federal legislation
University-related legislation
1971 in education